Stigmella wollofella is a moth of the family Nepticulidae. It was described by Gustafsson in 1972 and is endemic to Gambia where it was discovered in Gambia River, which flows between Basse Santa Su and Banjul.

The larvae feed on Ziziphus mauritiana. They probably mine the leaves of their host plant.

References

Nepticulidae
Moths described in 1972
Endemic fauna of the Gambia
Moths of Africa